Neil William Burnett (born 16 December 1961) is an English-born Scottish former cricketer.

Burnett was born at Wolstanton near Newcastle upon Tyne, where he was initially educated at Wolstanton Grammar School. After moving to Scotland, he continued his education at Arbroath High School. A club cricketer for Arbroath United Cricket Club, Burnett made his debut for Scotland in a List A one-day match against Worcestershire at Glasgow in the 1986 Benson & Hedges Cup. Over the next three years, Burnett was a regular member of the Scottish one-day side, making eleven appearances across the Benson & Hedges Cup and the NatWest Trophy. In his eleven one-day matches, he scored 118 runs at an average of 13.11, with a highest score of 27. With his right-arm medium pace bowling, he took 6 wickets at a bowling average of 40.50, with best figures of 2 for 60. In addition to playing one-day cricket for Scotland, Burnett also made a single appearance in first-class cricket against Ireland in 1986, scoring 4 runs in the match and going wicketless across both Ireland innings'. 

Burnett later captained Arbroath, and following the end of his playing career he served as club president. Outside of cricket, Burnett was a civil servant.

References

External links
 

1961 births
Living people
People from Wolstanton
People educated at Wolstanton Grammar School
Scottish people of English descent
People educated at Arbroath High School
Scottish cricketers
Scottish civil servants